Navicula cari is a species of algae in the genus Navicula. Navicula cari occur in eutrophic waters.

References

Further reading
 
 
 
 
 
 
 

cari
Species described in 1836